New York Afternoon is an album by saxophonist Richie Cole's Alto Madness recorded in 1976 and released on the Muse label.

Reception

Allmusic noted "This Muse album features the group that altoist Richie Cole and the late singer Eddie Jefferson co-led in the mid-'70s. They had a mutually beneficial relationship, with Cole learning from the older vocalist and Jefferson gaining extra exposure from associating with the popular young saxophonist".

Track listing 
All compositions by Richie Cole except where noted
 "Dorothy's Den" – 5:33
 "Waltz for a Rainy Be Bop Evening" – 5:15
 "Alto Madness" – 6:10
 "New York Afternoon" – 4:38
 "It's the Same Thing Everywhere" – 3:10
 "Stormy Weather (Trenton Style)" (James P. Johnson) – 6:00
 "You'll Always Be My Friend" (Vic Juris) – 5:05

Personnel 
Richie Cole – alto saxophone
Eddie Jefferson – vocals
Vic Juris – guitar
Mickey Tucker – piano, electric piano
Rick Laird – bass, electric bass
Eddie Gladden – drums
Ray Mantilla – percussion

References 

Richie Cole (musician) albums
1977 albums
Muse Records albums